Lavaran (also Romanized as Lāvarān) is a village in Moghuyeh Rural District, in the Central District of Bandar Lengeh County, Hormozgan Province, Iran. At the 2006 census, its population was 103, in 18 families.

References 

Populated places in Bandar Lengeh County